Californians for Population Stabilization (CAPS) is a non-profit California organization founded in 1986 which works to "preserve California's future through the stabilization of our state's human population". CAPS was the former Californian branch of the Zero Population Growth (ZPG) organization.

Overview
Its aim is to help advance state policies and programs designed to stabilize the population at a level which they feel "will preserve a good quality of life for all Californians". It asserts that the current growth of population is "unsustainable" and contributes to a growing strain on the environment and infrastructure.

Immigration
CAPS supports immigration reduction. In 1993, CAPS filed a lawsuit against Hewlett Packard alleging that HP was violating California labor laws and paid residents of India who came to the U.S. below-market wages as contract programmers. The lawsuit was first publicized on CBS's 60 Minutes. CAPS claimed that such wage practices would drive down wages for U.S. workers. CAPS ultimately lost the lawsuit.

Notes

External links
Californians for Population Stabilization website
 David M. Reimers (1998) Unwelcome strangers: American identity and the turn against immigration, Columbia University Press, portion of book regarding CAPS

Anti-immigration politics in the United States
Immigration to the United States
Environmental organizations based in California
Sustainability organizations
Organizations promoting population moderation
Human overpopulation think tanks
Political and economic think tanks in the United States
Population concern advocacy groups
Population concern organizations
Population organizations
Non-profit organizations based in California